During the 1963–64 season, Red Star Belgrade participated in the 1963–64 Yugoslav First League, 1963–64 Yugoslav Cup and 1963–64 Intertoto Cup.

Season summary 
Red Star won their second double in this season. Dragoslav Šekularac missed the majority of the season due to his mandatory military service.

Squad

Results

Yugoslav First League

Yugoslav Cup

Intertoto Cup

See also 
 List of Red Star Belgrade seasons

References 

Red Star Belgrade seasons
Red Star
Red Star
Yugoslav football championship-winning seasons